Antaeotricha trivallata is a moth in the family Depressariidae. It was described by Edward Meyrick in 1934. It is found in Costa Rica.

References

External Link
Original description link
Moths described in 1934
trivallata
Moths of Central America